Ferrone is a surname. Notable people with the surname include:

Dan Ferrone (born 1958), Canadian football player
Felicia Ferrone, American industrial and furniture designer
John Ferrone (1924–2016), American book editor
Steve Ferrone (born 1950), English drummer